The 1956–59 Nordic Football Championship was the seventh tournament staged. Four Nordic countries participated: Denmark, Finland, Norway and Sweden. Sweden won the tournament, its fifth Nordic Championship win.

Results

1956

1957

1958

1959

Table
'Two points for a victory, one point for a draw, no points for a loss.

Winners

Statistics

Goalscorers

See also
Balkan CupBaltic CupCentral European International CupMediterranean Cup

References

External links

1956–59
1956–57 in European football
1957–58 in European football
1958–59 in European football
1959–60 in European football
1956–57 in Swedish football
1957–58 in Swedish football
1959 in Swedish football
1960 in Swedish football
1956–57 in Danish football
1958 in Danish football
1959 in Danish football
1956 in Norwegian football
1957 in Norwegian football
1958 in Norwegian football
1959 in Norwegian football
1956 in Finnish football
1957 in Finnish football
1958 in Finnish football
1959 in Finnish football